Jakub Svoboda (born 27 December 1989 in Přerov) is a Czech professional ice hockey player who currently plays with HC Kometa Brno in the Czech Extraliga.

References

External links

Czech ice hockey left wingers
HC Kometa Brno players
Living people
1989 births
Sportspeople from Přerov
HC Karlovy Vary players
Orli Znojmo players
Ravensburg Towerstars players
Lausitzer Füchse players
HC Dynamo Pardubice players
HC ZUBR Přerov players
PSG Berani Zlín players
Czech expatriate ice hockey players in Germany
Saginaw Spirit players
Czech expatriate ice hockey players in the United States